Henri Pantin (29 October 1873 – 21 August 1918) was a French fencer. He competed in the men's masters épée and the men's masters foil events at the 1900 Summer Olympics.

References

External links
 

1873 births
1918 deaths
French male épée fencers
French male foil fencers
Olympic fencers of France
Fencers at the 1900 Summer Olympics
Sportspeople from Bas-Rhin